Countess Maria Klara von Dietrichstein (7 September 1626 – 28 January 1667), was a German noblewoman, by birth a member of the princely Dietrichstein family and by marriage Countess von Trauttmansdorff.

She was the sixth child and fifth (but fourth surviving) daughter of Maximilian, 2nd Prince von Dietrichstein zu Nikolsburg, and his first wife Princess Anna Maria, a daughter of Karl I, Prince of Liechtenstein, Duke of Troppau and Jägerndorf.

Life

In Vienna on 16 January 1650, Maria Klara married with Count Johann Frederick of Trauttmansdorff, Baron von Gleichenberg (5 January 1619 – 4 February 1696), Imperial Chamberlain and Privy Counsellor. They had six children:

 Sophie Regina (1652 – ?), married on 25 February 1677 to Johann Joseph, Baron Jenischek von Augeszd.
 Johann Frederick Franz (1654 – 26 July 1687).
 Maria Katharina (1656 – 28 July 1673).
 Johanna Beatrix Isabella (9 March 1661 – 13 April 1741), married firstly on 19 May 1680 to Count Wolfgang Thomas Erdödy and secondly on 9 June 1693 to Count Nikolaus Erdödy.
 Maria Elisabeth Anna (3 Sep 1663 – ?), a nun.
 Maria Klara Eleonore (1664/67 – 7 August 1724), married in 1685 to Count Georg Frederick von Mörsperg.

Notes

1626 births
1667 deaths
Dietrichstein family